Daniel Manz (born September 12, 1987 in Kempten im Allgäu, Bavaria) is a German taekwondo practitioner. He won a silver medal for the 68 kg division at the 2008 European Taekwondo Championships in Rome, Italy. Manz is also the husband of two-time Olympic taekwondo jin Sümeyye Gülec.

Manz qualified for the men's 68 kg class at the 2008 Summer Olympics in Beijing, after placing second from the European Qualification Tournament in Istanbul, Turkey. He defeated Kyrgyzstan's Rasul Abduraim in the preliminary round of sixteen, before losing out the quarterfinal match to U.S. taekwondo jin Mark López, with a score of 1–3. Because his opponent advanced further into the final match, Manz took advantage of the repechage round by defeating Afghanistan's Nesar Ahmad Bahave. He progressed to the bronze medal match, but narrowly lost the medal to Chinese Taipei's Sung Yu-Chi, with a sudden death score of 3–4.

References

External links
  
 
 NBC 2008 Olympics profile

1987 births
Living people
German male taekwondo practitioners
Olympic taekwondo practitioners of Germany
Taekwondo practitioners at the 2008 Summer Olympics
People from Kempten im Allgäu
Sportspeople from Swabia (Bavaria)
European Taekwondo Championships medalists
21st-century German people